Kelly van Zon (born 15 September 1987 in Oosterhout, Netherlands) is a Dutch table tennis player competing in both disabled and able-bodied competitions. She currently plays for Dutch club TTV SKF in Veenendaal. She competed at the 2020 Summer Paralympics, in Women's individual class 7, winning a gold medal, and in Women's team class 6–8, winning a silver medal.

General Interest
Van Zon began playing table tennis at the age of nine at TTV BSM Dongen. She made her international debut at the 2002 Malmö Open in Sweden. Due to a functional disability of her left hip and leg she competes in Class 7 competitions. Besides competing at a top level in table tennis, she studies Marketing and Communication at Johan Cruijff College in Nijmegen, which allows her to successfully combine sport and studies. Van Zon's old club in Dongen named their practice hall after her, the Kelly Van Zon Sportszaal.

By winning the title at the 2011 European Championships in Split, Croatia, she qualified directly for the London 2012 Paralympics. On this Paralympic Games, she won gold by defeating the Russian Yulia Ovsyannikova. In 2016, she prolonged her Paralympic title by winning the final and defeating the Turkish Kubra Korkut.

Van Zon was strongly tipped for the delayed 2020 Summer Paralympics.

Career records

Paralympic Games

 2008 Beijing, China: Women's Singles Class 6/7

 2012 London, England: Women's Singles Class 7

 2016 Rio de Janeiro, Brazil: Women's Singles Class 7

 2020 Tokyo, Japan: Women's Singles Class 7

 2020 Tokyo, Japan: Women's Team Class 6-8

World Championships
 2006 Montreux, Switzerland: Women's Singles Class 6/7

 2010 Gwangju, Korea: Women's Singles Class 7

European Championships
 2005 Liso di Jeolo, Italy: Women's Singles Class 6/7

 2007 Kranjska Gora, Slovenia: Women's Singles Class 6/7

 2009 European Championships, Genoa: Women's Singles Class 6/7

 2009 Genoa, Italy: Women's Team Class 6–8

 2011 European Championships, Split: Women's Singles Class 7

 2011 Split, Croatia: Women's Team Class 6/7

References

External links
 https://web.archive.org/web/20120425162735/http://www.kellyvanzon.nl/

1987 births
Dutch female table tennis players
Table tennis players at the 2008 Summer Paralympics
Table tennis players at the 2012 Summer Paralympics
Paralympic table tennis players of the Netherlands
Medalists at the 2008 Summer Paralympics
Medalists at the 2012 Summer Paralympics
Medalists at the 2016 Summer Paralympics
Medalists at the 2020 Summer Paralympics
Paralympic medalists in table tennis
Paralympic gold medalists for the Netherlands
Paralympic silver medalists for the Netherlands
Paralympic bronze medalists for the Netherlands
People from Dongen 
People from Oosterhout
Sportspeople from North Brabant

Living people
Table tennis players at the 2020 Summer Paralympics